A Blu-ray ripper is a computer program that facilitates copying a Blu-ray disc or HD DVDs to a hard disk drive.

Applications

System support/minimum-requirements

Software tagged as "no longer available" is due to New York federal court by AACS group legal action in later March, 2014. Remaining existing US software have disabled the decrypt / unencrypt / de-lock feature that allows bypass the Blu-ray disc protections. As from October, 2014 MakeMKV, MyBD and AnyDVD (AnyDVD is like a driver for decrypt purposes only) are able to decrypt Blu-ray disc protection as being are freeware applications.

Disabling DRM

See also
 Blu-ray Disc
 Blu-ray Disc authoring
 Blu-ray Disc recordable
 List of Blu-ray player manufacturers
 List of Blu-ray disc manufacturers
 DVD ripper

References

Blu-ray Disc
Ripping